Pharmacotherapy: The Journal of Human Pharmacology and Drug Therapy is a monthly peer-reviewed medical journal covering human pharmacology and pharmacotherapy, published by Wiley-Blackwell on behalf of the American College of Clinical Pharmacy, of which it is an official journal. It was established in 1981 under founding editor-in-chief Russel R. Miller. The second editor was Richard T. Scheife. The third and current editor is C. Lindsay DeVane. Initially published six times a year the journal has been a monthly since 1991.

Abstracting and indexing
The journal is abstracted and indexed in:

According to the Journal Citation Reports, the journal has a 2014 impact factor of 2.662, ranking it 104th out of 254 journals in the category "Pharmacology & Pharmacy".

References

Further reading

External links
 
 American College of Clinical Pharmacy

Pharmacotherapy journals
Publications established in 1981
English-language journals
Monthly journals
Wiley-Blackwell academic journals